Ralph Ashton may refer to:

 Roger Ashton (died 1592), English Roman Catholic soldier
 Ralph de Ashton (fl. 1421–1486), officer of state under Edward IV of England